The Malta Film Awards were a group of television and film awards given to nominated media. They were hosted by the Malta Film Commission in the Mediterranean Conference Centre in Valletta, Malta. The event occurred on 29 January 2022 following a 'Malta Film Week'. This 'Film Week' included conferences, masterclasses and panel discussions. The Film Awards were hosted by writer David Walliams.

Awards

Nominations 
The nominations for the Malta Film Awards were announced on 16 December 2021

References 

2022 film awards
Maltese film awards